The Busselton Football Club is an Australian rules football club which competes in the South West Football League in the South West corner of Western Australia.

It is based in the Western Australian city of Busselton.
The club is the result of a merger between East Busselton and West Busselton in 1955. It has played all its games in South West Football League.

Club history
In 1954 two Busselton based clubs, East Busselton and West Busselton joined the then Bunbury-Collie FL.  Impressed by the improved standard in play the two clubs decided to merge to form a more competitive team, the Busselton Football Club was created.

Premierships
 1964, 1967, 1978, 1996, 2012, 2015

Notable players
 Ashton Hams
 Graham House (cricketer)
 Phil Kelly
 Demi Liddle

References

Further reading 
 A Way of Life - The Story of country football in Western Australia - Alan East
 WA footy forum

External links
 www.swfl.com.au
official club website

Australian rules football clubs established in 1955
Australian rules football clubs in Western Australia
South West Football League clubs
1955 establishments in Australia
Busselton